The North Bloomfield Mining and Gravel Company of North Bloomfield, California, was established in 1866 and operated a hydraulic gold-mining operation at the Malakoff Mine subsequent to the California Gold Rush. In its day, no other company's operations matched North Bloomfield Mining and Gravel Company in size or expense. The company operated until 1910. In the years prior, its profits and procedures had been reduced due to the landmark ruling of Woodruff v. North Bloomfield Gravel Mining Company. 

The company office is still standing.

History
The North Bloomfield Mining and Gravel Company was owned by 30 investors from San Francisco, led by railroad baron Lester I. Robinson, and William Ralston, a silver miner from Sun Mountain in Nevada. The company's water rights were the same watershed as Summit Water and Irrigation Company's but lower down on Canyon Creek. The principal reservoir was at Bowman Lake, while others included Crooked, Island, Middle, Round, English/Rudyard, Sawmill, and Shotgun Reservoirs.  The company's main canal was the Bloomfield Ditch, but, according to Superintendent L.L. Meyers, only a small fraction of the ditch's water was used for irrigation and most was used for mine operations.

The company had numerous operations in Nevada County, including Union Diggings at Columbia Hill, but those at Malakoff Mine were the most notable. After tunnel completion, the company reached its peak processing of 50,000 tons of gravel each day by operating seven giant monitors twenty-four hours a day, seven days a week. In the company's 1879 year-end report, the company's president hailed a major improvement as
"... electric light of 12,000 candle intensity ... to facilitate mining operations at night better than the pitch bonfires heretofore used."

Sawyer Decision
The tailings, dumped into the Yuba River, destroyed farm land as far west as Sacramento, creating California's first major environmental controversy. in September 1882, Edwards Woodruff, a disgruntled New Yorker who owned farmland in Marysville, brought suit in Woodruff v. North Bloomfield Gravel Mining Company, an anti-debris lawsuit. By June 1883, the case was at trial. On 1884-01-07, Judge Lorenzo Sawyer handed down what became known as the Sawyer Decision, among the first environmental decisions in the United States. While North Bloomfield Mining and Gravel Company was notable for operating the world's largest hydraulic gold mine in 1884, the Sawyer Decision abruptly ended hydraulic mining in Gold Country soon after. The tailings can still be found on the river as the Yuba Goldfields.

Other mining companies in the region
 Birdseye Creek Mining Company, between You Bet and Red Dog, north of the Bear River
 Excelsior Water and Mining Company, around Smartville
 Gold Run Ditch and Mining Company, at Dutch Flat
 Milton Mining and Water Company, between North San Juan and French Corral
 Polar Star and Southern Cross Company, around Bear River
 Spring Valley Mining Company, above Oroville on the north fork of Feather River
 Summit Water and Irrigation Company, North Bloomfield
 Union Gravel Mining Company

California Historical Landmark
North Bloomfield Mining and Gravel Company was registered as California Historical Landmark No. 852 in 1972-01-20.  The plaque is situated at the park diggins overlook, affixed to a rock wall, and states:
NORTH BLOOMFIELD MINING AND GRAVEL COMPANY
"This was a major hydraulic gold-mining operation in California. It boasted a vast system of canals and flumes, its 7,800-foot drainage tunnel was termed a feat of engineering skill. It was the principal defendant in an anti-debris lawsuit settled in 1884 by Judge Lorenzo Sawyer's famous decision, which created control that virtually ended hydraulic mining in California."
CALIFORNIA REGISTERED HISTORICAL LANDMARK NO. 852
Plaque placed by the State Department of Parks and Recreation in cooperation with the Malakoff Citizens' Advisory Committee and E Clampus Vitus No. 10, June 11, 1972.

See also
California Historical Landmarks in Nevada County

References

External links

 Woodruff v. North Bloomfield Mining Gravel Co., et als, Circuit Court, District of California
 Photos of the company's mining operations
 Photo of California Historical Landmark plaque

Defunct mining companies of the United States
Gold mining companies of the United States
Companies based in Nevada County, California
History of Nevada County, California
California Historical Landmarks
California Gold Rush
American companies established in 1866
Non-renewable resource companies established in 1866
1866 establishments in California